The 2014 Sarasota Open was a professional tennis tournament played on clay courts. It was the sixth edition of the tournament which was part of the 2014 ATP Challenger Tour. It took place in Sarasota, Florida, United States between 14 and 20 April 2014.

Singles main-draw entrants

Seeds

Other entrants
The following players received wildcards into the singles main draw:
  Sekou Bangoura
  Mac Styslinger
  Daniel Kosakowski
  Jarmere Jenkins

The following players received entry from the qualifying draw:
  Gianni Mina 
  Naoki Nakagawa 
  Antonio Veić 
  Alexander Zverev

Doubles main-draw entrants

Seeds

Other entrants
The following pairs received wildcards into the doubles main draw:
 Sekou Bangoura /  Vahid Mirzadeh
 Siddhartha Chappidi /  Joel Link
 Jarmere Jenkins /  Mac Styslinger

The following pairs received entry from the qualifying draw:
 Rubén Ramírez Hidalgo /  Franko Škugor

Champions

Singles

 Nick Kyrgios def.  Filip Krajinović, 7–6(12–10), 6–4

Doubles

 Marin Draganja /  Henri Kontinen def.  Rubén Ramírez Hidalgo /  Franko Škugor, 7–5, 5–7, [10–6]

External links
Official Website

Sarasota Open
Sarasota Open
Sarasota Open
2014 in sports in Florida
2014 in American tennis